Joakim Lundström (born February 25, 1984) is a Swedish former professional ice hockey goaltender. His youth team was Strömsbro IF.

Playing career 
Lundström played his first professional game during the 2003–04 Elitserien season with Brynäs IF. He played three Elitserien games that season. Lundström then spent the six following seasons in lesser divisions, mainly with IF Sundsvall Hockey of the HockeyAllsvenskan, but also with Valbo HC of the Swedish Division 1, before signing with Frölunda HC prior to the 2010–11 season. Playing 19 Elitserien games, he posted a 91.57 save percentage during the 2010–11 season. In April 2011, Lundström signed with Timrå IK.

In June 2017 Joakim signed with HC Košice

Game-show participation 
Lundström participated in the 2011 edition of the Swedish game show Postkodkampen, being Team Timrå's leader. The team advanced to the semifinal, after beating Team Mariestad.

References

External links 

1984 births
Living people
Admiral Vladivostok players
Almtuna IS players
Borås HC players
Brynäs IF players
HSC Csíkszereda players
Frölunda HC players
HIFK (ice hockey) players
HC Košice players
Leksands IF players
KHL Medveščak Zagreb players
HC Nové Zámky players
People from Gävle
IF Sundsvall Hockey players
Swedish ice hockey goaltenders
Timrå IK players
Sportspeople from Gävleborg County
Swedish expatriate ice hockey people in Romania
Swedish expatriate sportspeople in Croatia
Expatriate ice hockey players in Croatia
Swedish expatriate sportspeople in Russia
Expatriate ice hockey players in Russia
Swedish expatriate ice hockey players in Finland